An almshouse (also known as a bede-house, poorhouse, or hospital)  was charitable housing provided to people in a particular community, especially during the Middle Ages. They were often targeted at the poor of a locality, at those from certain forms of previous employment, or their widows, and at elderly people who could no longer pay rent, and are generally maintained by a charity or the trustees of a bequest (alms are, in the Christian tradition, money or services donated to support the poor and indigent). Almshouses were originally formed as extensions of the church system and were later adapted by local officials and authorities.

History
Many almshouses are European Christian institutions though some are secular. Almshouses provide subsidised accommodation, often integrated with social care resources such as wardens.

England

Almshouses were established from the 10th century in Britain, to provide a place of residence for poor, old and distressed people. They were sometimes called bede-houses, and the residents bedesmen or bedeswomen. Bede is the Anglo-Saxon word for prayer, and the almsmen and women were obliged to pray for the founder of the charity. The first recorded almshouse was founded in York by King Athelstan; the oldest still in existence is the Hospital of St. Cross in Winchester, dating to about 1132. In the Middle Ages, the majority of European hospitals functioned as almshouses. Many of the medieval almshouses in England were established with the aim of benefiting the soul of the founder or their family, and they usually incorporated a chapel. As a result, most were regarded as chantries and were dissolved during the Reformation under the Abolition of Chantries Acts, 1545 and 1547.

The legal basis for civil almshouses and workhouses in England was the Act for the Relief of the Poor. These institutions underwent various population, program, and name changes, but by 1900 the elderly made up 85 percent of the residents of these institutions.

Almshouses generally have charitable status and aim to support the continued independence of their residents. There is an important delineation between almshouses and other forms of sheltered housing in that almshouse residents generally have no security of tenure, being solely dependent upon the goodwill of the administering trustees.

Some 2,600 almshouses continue to be operated in the UK, providing 30,000 dwellings for 36,000 people.

Netherlands
Almshouses were first founded in Holland in the Middle Ages.  Usually founded by rich citizens or guilds, these almshouses "constituted a well-organized system of relief".

A number of hofjes are still functioning as accommodation for elderly people. Most residents are women.

Norway
In 1269 or 1270 an almshouse was established in Stavanger as the first known in Norway.

United States
The English tradition of almshouses was introduced to the Commonwealth of Pennsylvania by its founder, William Penn. The Maryland legislature created almshouses in Anne Arundel County, financed by property taxes on landowners throughout the state. Massachusetts also had a long tradition of almshouses. In the United States, aid tended to be limited to the elderly and disabled, and children had to sleep in the same rooms as adults.

The first almshouse in United States history was founded in Boston, Massachusetts, in 1622.  The original Boston Almshouse was burned down in 1682 and was rebuilt away from the heart of Boston nearly a decade later.

In 1884, the statistical analysis of the Massachusetts almshouses showed four in the city of Boston and 225 almshouses throughout the state. These almshouses housed nearly 7,000 people. Of these residents, 700 were believed to have a mental illness. Half of these almshouses did not house children.

Upon entering the almshouses in Connecticut, patients were whipped ten times. There were similar institutions developed from 1725–1773 in Pennsylvania, Rhode Island, Virginia, and New York. At the Pennsylvania Hospital, some "lunatics" were chained to a cellar wall or made to wear a primitive straitjacket.
Before the American Civil War, local officials regulated almshouses and did not ensure the people inside them were being cared for in the proper way or given the time they needed for help. It was not until the 1860s that more progressive states such as New York began to create boards that regulated, inspected, and reported on almshouses.

The Newark almshouse opened in September 1878 as a branch of the Syracuse State School. It was located on 104 acres of land within the town of Newark, New Jersey, and held around 853 patients. The nine dormitory buildings that housed the patients were able to hold anywhere from 45 to 130 people. There was also a small hospital within the almshouse that could hold up to 30 patients. There were not many employees, only about 110, to take care of the hundreds of young women admitted to the almshouse. Patients were committed to the Newark State School by superintendents of the poor as well as judges who declared them insane or feeble-minded in court.

Many of the patients of the New York Custodial Asylum for Feeble-Minded Women were falsely considered to be mentally ill. Mary Lake was the daughter of a young woman who had been sentenced to 10 years in a state prison. Mary and her other siblings were split up and put into almshouses. She was committed to the almshouse in Newark as feeble-minded. It was not until years later where she was pronounced not mentally ill and was able to leave the almshouse.

Throughout the 19th century almshouses were a last resort for those who were poor, disabled, and elderly. Residents experienced mistreatment, destitution, and inhumanity. As almshouses continued into the 19th century, activists such as Dorothea Dix fought for institutional reform. Dix sought to remove children, the mentally ill, and the developmentally disabled from all almshouses and increase the number of institutions, hospitals, and asylums for them to reside in. As her movement gained momentum, she played a vital role in the establishment and expansion of over 30 hospitals for the treatment of the mentally ill. Her efforts removed specific groups from almshouses, leaving the elderly to remain.

One of the biggest problems with almshouses is that they were rarely self-sustaining. They were costly to run, and the capacity of the inmates to pay for their own keep by working at the farm, or working at the almshouse itself, was greatly overestimated. There were not enough staff, facilities were not kept up, and the poor kept coming. By the end of the 1800s, almshouses began to be replaced by asylums and institutions.

Description of layout

Almshouses are often multiple small terraced houses or apartments providing accommodation for small numbers of residents. The units may be constructed in a "U" shape around a communal courtyard. Some facilities included a chapel for religious worship.

The Bakewell Almshouses in Derbyshire, England – dating from 1709 – were six separate homes, hence the six front doors visible today. Each home had one tiny room downstairs and one upstairs, with no bathroom, toilet or kitchen. The Manners family, Dukes of Rutland from 1703, maintained the building until 1920. They gave it and the adjacent former town hall to the trustees who had been running the charity. The town hall was sold at a 1966 auction for £1,137. Financial problems caused the homes to become derelict and unfit for habitation by 2001. They were rescued and restored by the trustees in 2004–2006 at a cost of £325,000, which was raised through donations and grants. They are now three larger homes, combining modern facilities with many historical features.

In literature
The most famous almshouse in literature is probably Hiram's Hospital, the centrepiece of Anthony Trollope's novel The Warden, which is also featured in the sequel Barchester Towers.

Gallery

See also
Blockley Almshouse
Carroll County Almshouse and Farm, Westminster, Maryland
Halfway house
Hostel
List of almshouses in Ireland
 List of almshouses in the United Kingdom
Poorhouse
Workhouse

References

Further reading

 – Public domain text, including daily life, care, and the "Office at the Seclusion of a Leper"

External links

The Almshouse Association
The Almshouse Residents Action Group Catholic alms houses
List of English Almshouses associated with monastic institutions – from public domain text, English Monastic Life (1904)

Christian charities
House types
 
Poor Law in Britain and Ireland
Elderly care
Catholic charities
Private aid programs
Types of health care facilities
Types of hospitals

de:Armenhaus